The 1997 Speedway Grand Prix of Germany was the third race of the 1997 Speedway Grand Prix season. It took place on 6 July in the Ellermühle Stadium in Landshut, Germany It was the third Swedish SGP and was won by Danish rider Hans Nielsen. It was the fourth win of his career.

Starting positions draw 

The Speedway Grand Prix Commission nominated Robert Barth from Germany as Wild Card.
Draw .  (5) Henrik Gustafsson →  (18) Andy Smith
Draw .  (18) Andy Smith →  (17) Mikael Karlsson
Draw .  (17) Mikael Karlsson →  (19) Sam Ermolenko

Heat details

The intermediate classification

See also 
 Speedway Grand Prix
 List of Speedway Grand Prix riders

References

External links 
 FIM-live.com
 SpeedwayWorld.tv

Speedway Grand Prix of Germany
Ge
1997